The Journal of Chemical Sciences is a monthly peer-viewed scientific journal that publishes original research articles, rapid communications, reviews and perspective articles, covering many areas of Chemical Sciences. It also publishes special issues on frontier areas of the subject. It is published by the Indian Academy of Sciences and co-published by Springer. The editor-in-chief is S. Natarajan (Indian Institute of Science, Bengaluru).

History 

Originally a part of the Proceedings of the Indian Academy of Sciences – Section A, started in 1934, the journal evolved into an independent journal titled Proceedings – Chemical Sciences in 1978. It was retitled Journal of Chemical Sciences in 2004.

Abstracting and indexing 
The journal is abstracted and indexed in:

According to the Journal Citation Reports, the journal has a 2020 impact factor of 1.573.

References

External links 
 

Springer Science+Business Media academic journals
Chemistry journals
Bimonthly journals
Publications established in 1978
English-language journals